The 2009 NRL season was the 102nd season of professional rugby league football club competition in Australia, and the twelfth run by the National Rugby League. For the third consecutive year, sixteen teams competed for the 2009 Telstra Premiership title. The season commenced with the first match played on 13 March and ended with the Grand Final, played on 4 October. The Grand Final was won by the Melbourne Storm in their fourth consecutive grand final appearance. However, they were stripped of their Premiership on 22 April 2010 after they were found to be guilty of breaching the league's salary cap.

The second season of the National Youth Competition also commenced in line with the Telstra Premiership.

Season summary

This season the NRL introduced a second on-field referee. Previously when the ball changed possession the lone on-field referee would have to change his position to stay with the defending team. He also could only observe the ruck from one direction. The two-referee system saves the referees some running back and forth to get into position as possession changes and also improves watchfulness over the ruck.

The Manly Sea Eagles began their premiership title defense in horrific fashion, losing their first four games, before a stunning revival led to them losing only four of their final 16 regular season games. The St. George Illawarra Dragons, under new coach Wayne Bennett finished the regular season with their first minor premiership title as a joint venture club. However, the Dragons then became the first minor premiers since the Canterbury-Bankstown Bulldogs in 1993 to be eliminated from the final series in consecutive losses.

For the first time since the McIntyre final eight system was introduced, a game was played twice in a row in the same stadium. This happened when the Dragons and Parramatta Eels played each other in round 26 (the final regular season round) and again in the first week of finals, both at WIN Jubilee Oval at Kogarah. The first game saw St George Illawarra come away with a 37-0 win in front of 17,974, while the next weeks Qualifying final saw Parramatta reverse the result with a 25-12 win in front of 18,174.

The Eels went on to become the first side since the McIntyre final eight system was introduced (in 1999) to make the grand final from eighth position. Along the way, they defeated the top three teams – the St George Illawarra Dragons, Gold Coast Titans and Bulldogs – in their three finals series matches, to make it to their first Grand Final since 2001. Their Grand Final opponents, the Melbourne Storm, were playing in their fourth straight Grand Final and were looking for their third premiership having previously won in 1999 and 2007.

In 2009, NRL games on New Zealand's Sky network drew average audiences of 46,221.

Records set in 2009
 Bulldogs winger Hazem El Masri broke the all-time highest points record of 2,176 previously set by former Newcastle Knights halfback Andrew Johns when he scored 14 points against Manly-Warringah Sea Eagles in Round 1.
 St George Illawarra Dragons winger Brett Morris and his twin, Bulldogs centre Josh Morris, set the record for the most tries scored by brothers in a regular season (42). The pair record a further five tries between them in the finals series, with Brett scoring 25 to Josh's 22.
 The Brisbane Broncos suffered their worst defeat in their 22-year history losing 56–0 to the Canberra Raiders in round 21 at Canberra Stadium.
 A record finals attendance (excluding grand finals) was set when the Parramatta Eels and Bulldogs preliminary final drew a crowd of 74,549 at ANZ Stadium. With the exception of all Grand Finals played at ANZ since 1999, and the 1965 Grand Final at the Sydney Cricket Ground, this remains the highest attendance for any game since the premiership began in 1908.
 Cameron Smith became the Melbourne Storm's leading point scorer, overtaking now-Sea Eagles half Matt Orford in the preliminary final against the Brisbane Broncos.
 The Melbourne Storm became the first club since the Parramatta sides of the 1981, 1982, 1983 and 1984 seasons to make four consecutive grand finals.
 The Parramatta Eels were the first team ever under the McIntyre system to finish 8th in the regular season and make it to the grand final.

Advertising
Keen to speak to its grass roots following in light of the AFL's aggressive expansion in rugby league's suburban heartland the NRL and its agency MJW Hakuhodo created a TVC which tells the story of junior rugby league players enjoying the game and perhaps becoming stars of the future. The commercial featured two young boys playing league in a suburban park. As they contest the game, they morph into stars of the League  as a packed stadium emerges around them. Seven-year-old Penrith junior Cameron Lloyd and 14-year-old La Perouse junior Alex Johnston play the main roles in the campaign with Johnson morphing into Melbourne's Greg Inglis scoring a try in corner in a big match. Announcing the 2009 launch TVC

The ad's strapline was "Feel It" and the soundtrack a re-worked version of 2008 Australian Idol winner Wes Carr's "Feels Like Whoa."

Teams
The clubs in the League for 2009 remained unchanged for the third consecutive year, with sixteen participating in the regular season: ten from New South Wales, three from Queensland and one from each of Victoria, the Australian Capital Territory and New Zealand. Of the ten from New South Wales, eight were from Sydney's metropolitan area (with St. George Illawarra being a Sydney and Wollongong joint venture). Just two foundation clubs from the 1908 New South Wales Rugby Football League season played in this competition: the Roosters and the Rabbitohs.

Ladder

Finals series

The NRL finals series adopted the McIntyre final eight system. Four teams made a return to the 2009 finals from 2008, grand finalists Melbourne Storm, Manly-Warringah Sea Eagles along with the Brisbane Broncos and St George Illawarra Dragons. Both the Bulldogs and Parramatta Eels made a return after being absent in 2008. The Newcastle Knights made the finals for the first time since 2006 and their first since the departure of club legend Andrew Johns. The Gold Coast Titans entered their maiden finals series. It was also the first finals series since 2002 that no team was held scoreless.

Grand final

Club and Player records
The following figures were collected from the completion of round 26 of the regular season and therefore do not represent any figures associated with the finals series or any representative matches for this year.

Top 5 point scorers

Top 5 try scorers

Most points in a match by an individual

Most tries in a match by an individual

Largest winning margin

Most points in a match

Fewest points in a match

Most points scored in a match by an individual team

 More NRL statistics

Jarryd Hayne ran 4,429 metres with the ball in 2009, more than any other player in the competition.

Attendance
2009's regular season attendance figures were the highest recorded in Australian rugby league history, with a total of 3,081,849. This figure bettered the previous record set by the 1995 Winfield Cup's regular season (3,061,338 in a 20 team competition) and also beat the Telstra Premiership's previous best of 3,024,149 set in 2007.

The 2009 season also saw the second highest average crowd figure of a regular season, with a crowd average of 16,051, behind the best of 16,466 set in the 2005 NRL season.

The 20 highest regular season match attendances:

2009 Transfers

Players

Coaches

See also
 2009 NRL season results
 2009 NRL Under-20s season
 2009 Dally M Awards
 2009 in rugby league

References

External links
 NRL.com – Official site of the NRL, National Rugby League